The 2018 MTV Video Music Awards was held on August 20, 2018 at Radio City Music Hall in New York City. The 35th annual award show aired live from the venue for the 12th time, the most of any previous venue in its history. Cardi B led the list of nominees with twelve nominations. Cardi and Childish Gambino were the most awarded of the night with three each. Camila Cabello won Video of the Year and Artist of the Year, while Jennifer Lopez became the first Latin artist to receive the Michael Jackson Video Vanguard Award. This edition of the MTV Video Music Awards saw yet another severe drop in ratings, only achieving a mere 2.2 million viewers on MTV, and only seeing 4.87 million viewers on all of its sister networks.

Performances

 This artist performed as part of the Push Artist Stage.

Presenters

Pre-show
Terrence J – presented Song of Summer and Push Artist of the Year

Main show
Cardi B – opened the show and introduced Shawn Mendes
Kevin Hart and Tiffany Haddish – did a brief comedy routine and presented Best Hip Hop
G-Eazy and Shay Mitchell – introduced Bazzi on the Push Artist stage
Anna Kendrick and Blake Lively – presented Best Pop
Teyana Taylor and Kyle – introduced Logic and Ryan Tedder
Ken Jeong – announced the top 2 nominees for Best New Artist and explained voting procedures
Jimmy Fallon – introduced Panic! at the Disco
Backstreet Boys – presented Song of the Year
Liam Payne and Shanina Shaik – presented Best Latin
Shawn Mendes – presented the Video Vanguard Award
Social House and Karlie Kloss – introduced Ariana Grande
Keegan-Michael Key and Olivia Munn – presented Artist of the Year
Millie Bobby Brown – presented Best New Artist
DJ Khaled – introduced Travis Scott and James Blake
Gucci Mane – presented Best Collaboration
Amandla Stenberg, Algee Smith and Sabrina Carpenter – presented Video with a Message 
Rita Ora and Bebe Rexha – introduced Maluma
Madonna – made a tribute speech about Aretha Franklin and presented Video of the Year
Lenny Kravitz – introduced Post Malone and 21 Savage
Source:

Winners and nominees
The nominees for most categories were revealed on July 16, 2018, via an IGTV video.  Nominees for Song of Summer, however, were announced on August 13, 2018. Cardi B had the most nominations with 12, with The Carters behind with 8, while Childish Gambino and Drake both received 7 nominations each. Winners were announced on August 20, 2018, on the Video Music Awards broadcast.

Artists with multiple wins and nominations

Critical reception
Entertainment Weeklys writer Darren Franich gave the show a B− and said, "MTV's tagline for the 2018 Video Music Awards was 'Everything might happen.' Hey, they said might. The 35th VMAs had some fiery performances, but the show never quite sparked [...] This was a reasonably satisfying awards show, not the boring trainwreck some VMAs have been, not the exciting trainwreck supernova some VMAs dare to be." For Variety, Daniel D'addario said, "There was a time when the VMAs were a change-of-season status report on pop: As MTV’s target audience heads back to school and those slightly outside that audience get ready to turn their mind to graver things, the pop world had historically united to put on a show that could carry viewers into the fall." and unfavorably compared it to the 2013 show line up. In Billboard, Leila Cobo wrote, "although this year's awards haven't escaped criticism, it hasn't been for lack of Latin power," noting that "Maluma, Cardi B, Jennifer Lopez and Camila Cabello (finally) put Latin music center stage at VMAs."

See also
2018 MTV Europe Music Awards

References

External links
Official website

MTV Video Music
MTV Video Music Awards
MTV Video Music Awards
MTV Video Music Awards
2010s in Manhattan
MTV Video Music Awards
MTV Video Music Awards ceremonies